WSPX (94.5 FM) is a radio station broadcasting an urban gospel format. Licensed to Bowman, South Carolina, United States, the station is currently owned by Peter Schiff, through licensee Community Broadcasters, LLC.

References

External links

Radio stations established in 1998
Gospel radio stations in the United States
1998 establishments in South Carolina
SPX